Diamond Lil, or "Diamond Tooth Lil", was an early 20th century American popular icon of wealth and libertine burlesque. It may also refer to:
Diamond Lil (play), a 1928 Mae West play
Diamond Lil (Marvel Comics), a fictional mutant in Marvel Comics' Alpha Flight series
Diamond Lil (GoComics), a comic strip published by GoComics and created by Brett Koth
Katie Glass, a little person professional wrestler who used the ring name Diamond Lil
Diamond Lil', an aircraft named the same of a Consolidated B-24 Liberator bomber of World War II
"Diamond Lil", a song by American guitarist and songwriter David Bromberg